Igor Štimac (born 6 September 1967) is a Croatian football coach and former player who played as a centre back. He is the current head coach of the India national team.

In his playing career, Štimac had three spells with Hajduk Split and also played for Cádiz in Spain, and for Derby County and West Ham United in England. He represented the Croatia national team 53 times, playing at Euro 1996 and at the 1998 World Cup, when Croatia finished third. He also represented Yugoslavia when they won the 1987 FIFA World Youth Championship.

As a manager, Štimac was in charge of the Croatia national team from 2012 to 2013. In club football, he has had brief spells in charge of Hajduk Split, Cibalia, NK Zagreb, Zadar, Iranian club Sepahan and Qatari club Al-Shahania. On 15 May 2019, Štimac was appointed as the head coach of India national team on a two-year contract.

Club career
At the club level Štimac played for his local Croatian club Hajduk Split and, most notably, the English club Derby County. Štimac arrived at the Baseball Ground on 31 October 1995 for a fee of £1.5 million from Hajduk Split. He scored a goal on his debut for the Rams away at Tranmere, but the Rams fell to a heavy 5–1 defeat. The rest of the season was more successful, as Derby gained promotion and remained unbeaten in 20 consecutive matches.

Štimac played nearly four years with the Rams, and made 84 league appearances for the Rams, in addition to seven FA Cup appearances and two League Cup appearances. He was sold on 29 August 1999 to West Ham United for £600,000, where he scored once, against Newcastle United.

International career
Štimac played for the Croatia national team, winning 53 caps and scoring two goals, and formed part of a Croatia squad that won the bronze medal at the 1998 FIFA World Cup. His final international was a February 2002 friendly match against Bulgaria.

Previously, Štimac was a member of the highly talented Yugoslavia under-20 team that won the 1987 FIFA World Youth Championship in Chile, playing four games and scoring two goals in the tournament.

International goals

Managerial career

Early days
Štimac started his managerial career in 2001, taking charge of the Hajduk Split football academy and also acting as the club's sport director. Hajduk won two championships during this time (2003–04 and 2004–05). In 2004–05 season he took managerial position for the last 10 games after replacing Blaž Slišković. With many difficulties he managed to win championship but lost the cup final to HNK Rijeka. In the spring of 2006, he also spent a few months coaching Croatian first division side Cibalia, saving them from relegation. On 14 September 2009, he was appointed as the new NK Zagreb manager after they lost the first seven games of the season, replacing Luka Pavlović. However Štimac managed to save NK Zagreb from relegation and left the club at the end of the season.

Croatia national team
On 5 July 2012, Štimac was appointed as the new Croatia national football team manager, after the departure of his former national team teammate Slaven Bilić. His first match as Croatia manager came in a friendly game against Switzerland at Poljud Stadium, which ended in a disappointing 2–4 loss. Despite that loss, Croatia entered the 2014 World Cup qualifies in decent fashion, taking 16 points from first six games. However, the results were not representative of Croatia's form on the pitch, as the team only had a goal difference of +7 from those six matches and scored the majority of their goals from set pieces, counterattacks, and defensive errors by their opponents. Then started a period of very poor results starting with a 0–1 loss to Scotland at Maksimir on 7 June 2013. Following this Croatia lost 0–1 in a friendly match to Portugal on 10 June 2013 and then barely beat 148th ranked Liechtenstein 3–2 in a friendly match thanks to an 86th-minute goal by Eduardo on 14 August 2013.

In their next world cup qualifying match, Croatia drew 1–1 against rivals Serbia in Belgrade, despite only having one shot on target and two shots overall. This was followed by another loss at home at Maksimir, this time to eventual group winners Belgium with a result of 1–2. With only one World Cup qualifying match to go, Štimac had become widely unpopular in Croatia with one poll conducted by popular domestic newspaper 24sata resulting in 98% of voters in favor of sacking Štimac. On 15 October 2013, Croatia lost their final World Cup qualifying match 0–2 against Scotland. After the 0–2 loss to Scotland, Štimac tendered his resignation to the HNS president, former star footballer and national team teammate of Štimac, Davor Šuker. The following day, Šuker accepted his resignation. Croatia ending qualifying as the second to last ranked second place team, having only one more point than last placed Denmark, thus taking the final play-off round spot.

Despite some criticism Štimac managed to take the FIFA Ranking of Croatia to 4th position just behind Spain, Germany and Argentina, respectively. Players like Mateo Kovačić and Alen Halilović also made their debuts for the Croatia national team during Štimac's stint.

Zadar
In the beginning of 2015, Štimac was named as new manager at Prva HNL club Zadar. Štimac quit after only six months in charge, as club was administratively relegated to second division by the licensing board of the HNS due to financial irregularities 3 games before the league ended. Following Štimac's resignation, Zadar club president Josip Bajlo said, "I would like to thank Mr. Štimac for the five months that he has worked in Zadar, and he has still done the best in such situation".

Sepahan

On 12 November 2015, he became head coach of Sepahan, replacing Hossein Faraki. He resigned as Sepahan head coach on 20 April 2016, after a run of unsuccessful results which led Sepahan in the 11th place and out of both season's cups, Hazfi Cup and AFC Champions League.

India national team
On 15 May 2019, the All India Football Federation announced him as the country's head coach after the departure of Stephen Constantine. His first campaign with India was 2019 King's Cup where his first match as head coach was against Curaçao, which ended up as 3−1 loss where he has given six players their international debut but in the next match against the host Thailand he managed the team to a 1−0 victory acquiring the third place in the tournament and his first win after his appointment as the head coach.

For 2022 World Cup qualification, his campaign with India started with a 1–2 home loss to Oman, but steered the team to earn a respectable point after managing a draw against the 2019 Asian Champion and 2022 FIFA World Cup hosts Qatar. Despite this, India only managed draws against much lower ranked teams, Bangladesh at home and Afghanistan in away. India went on to be beaten by Oman and Qatar, as well as gaining only a draw over Afghanistan with their only win in the qualification being, a 2–0 win against neighbour Bangladesh, to finish in third place with only six points gained, thus not qualifying for the 2022 FIFA World Cup, even though it was the highest position India gained since the 2002 qualification that guaranteed India a place in the upcoming 2023 AFC Asian Cup qualification.

Indian U23
Stimac took charge of the India national under-23 football team at the start of their qualification campaign for the 2022 AFC Under 23 Cup in Uzbekistan, by playing three games for Group E in the centralised venue at the Fujairah Stadium, Fujairah, UAE.

On 24 October 2021, he started his tenure with a 2 to 1 victory over the Oman U23 team in Group E encounter in Fujairah.

Managerial statistics

Honours

Player
Hajduk Split
Croatian First League: 1992, 1994–95
Croatian Cup: 1995
Yugoslav Cup: 1991
Croatian Super Cup: 1994

Derby County
First Division runner-up: 1995–96

Yugoslavia U-20
FIFA U-20 World Cup: 1987

Manager
India
SAFF Championship: 2021

Orders
 Order of Danica Hrvatska with face of Franjo Bučar – 1995
 Order of the Croatian Trefoil – 1998

References

External links
 

Igor Štimac profile at Hajduk Split website 

1967 births
Living people
Sportspeople from Metković
Association football central defenders
Yugoslav footballers
Croatian footballers
Croatia international footballers
UEFA Euro 1996 players
1998 FIFA World Cup players
HNK Hajduk Split players
HNK Cibalia players
Cádiz CF players
Derby County F.C. players
West Ham United F.C. players
Yugoslav First League players
Croatian Football League players
La Liga players
Premier League players
Croatian expatriate footballers
Expatriate footballers in Spain
Croatian expatriate sportspeople in Spain
Expatriate footballers in England
Croatian expatriate sportspeople in England
Croatian football managers
HNK Hajduk Split managers
HNK Cibalia managers
NK Zagreb managers
Croatia national football team managers
NK Zadar managers
Sepahan S.C. managers
Al-Shahania Sports Club managers
India national football team managers
Persian Gulf Pro League managers
Croatian expatriate football managers
Expatriate football managers in Iran
Croatian expatriate sportspeople in Iran
Expatriate football managers in Qatar
Croatian expatriate sportspeople in Qatar
Expatriate football managers in India
Croatian expatriate sportspeople in India
HNK Hajduk Split non-playing staff